, also known as Lee Haku is a Japanese volleyball player, a member of the Japan men's national volleyball team and Toray Arrows in V.League division 1.

Personal life
His parents both immigrated from China, before Haku Lee was born. His mother was on the national volleyball team of China and his father was also an athlete. He has one younger sister that is 14 years younger. Though his parents are Chinese, Lee has become a naturalized citizen of Japan and was born there.

Career
Played Volleyball in high school from his mother's influence. Originally an ace wing spiker, he was changed to middle blocker in college. Lee played for the University of Tsukuba volley ball team until he graduated. After graduation he joined Toray Arrows

Sporting achievements

Individually
 2017 Asian Men's Volleyball Championship – Best Middle Blocker

References

External links
 Twitter Profile
 World League Profile JP 
 Toray Arrows Profile JP

1990 births
Living people
Japanese men's volleyball players
Sportspeople from Miyazaki Prefecture
Japanese sportspeople of Chinese descent
University of Tsukuba alumni
Universiade bronze medalists for Japan
Universiade medalists in volleyball
Medalists at the 2013 Summer Universiade
Volleyball players at the 2020 Summer Olympics
Olympic volleyball players of Japan
Middle blockers